René Maugé (born in 1757 - died 20 February 1802) was a French zoologist.
René Maugé was born in 1757 in Cély-en-Bière, in the Seine-et-Marne department near Paris, France. Nothing is known of his life prior to May 1794. In that month, he started work at the Muséum Nationale d’Histoire Naturelle, Paris, France, learning taxidermy and studying natural history (Jangoux 2009: 30). Maugé was trained by Louis Dufresne (1752-1832) who taught him to skin birds properly. Aged 39, he joined the first government-supported expedition captained by Nicolas Baudin towards Tenerife, St. Thomas, St. Croix and Puerto Rico (1796-1798) (Jangoux 2009: 30). The voyage was a success and 296 bird specimens collected by Maugé were brought back; 140+ specimens still survive. Aged 42, (Horner 1987: 400) he again left with Baudin on a voyage to Tenerife, Mauritius, Australia and Timor with the corvette Le Géographe and the store-ship Le Naturaliste which left Le Havre on 19 October 1800. Maugé was appointed by Antoine-Laurent de Jussieu, director of the MNHN, as one of the official expedition zoologists.  He died on board the Le Géographe when it was off the coast of Tasmania on 20 February 1802. He was buried on Maria Island (Baudin 1974: 340).

Zoological tributes 
 Aratinga chloroptera maugei, Puerto Rican conure, taxonomic authority Charles de Souancé, 1856.
 Dicaeum maugei, the blue-cheeked flowerpecker, taxonomic authority René Primevère Lesson 1830.
 Geopelia maugeus, barred dove, taxonomic authority Coenraad Jacob Temminck, 1809.
 Testacella maugei, species of carnivorous land slug, taxonomic authority André Étienne d'Audebert de Férussac, 1819.

References 

 Jangoux, M. 2009. Journal du voyage aux Antilles de La Bella Angélique (1796-1798). Presses de L’Université Paris-Sorbonne, Paris.
 Horner, F. 1987. The French reconnaissance: Baudin in Australia 1803-1803. Melbourne University Press, Melbourne.
 Jansen, J. J. F. J. 2017. René Maugé’s ornithological collections from Kupang Bay, West-Timor, Indonesia, August-November 1801, with special regard to type-specimens. Zoosystematics and Evolution 93 (2): 467-492. DOI 10.3897/zse.93.19964

French zoologists
National Museum of Natural History (France) people
1757 births
1802 deaths
Place of birth unknown